The 2009 season is the 6th season of competitive football by Universidad San Martín de Porres.

Statistics

Appearances and goals

Competition Overload

Copa Libertadores 2009

Group stage

Knockout stage

Primera División Peruana 2009

Regular season

Liguilla Final – Group B

Preseason friendlies

Transfers

In

Out

References

External links 
 Everything about Deportivo Universidad San Martín
 Deportivo Universidad San Martín de Porres – season 2009
 Deportivo Universidad San Martín de Porres – Copa Libertadores 2009

Universidad San Martín seasons
2009 in Peruvian football